Vasilis Kolovos (born 10 December 1945) is a Greek actor. He appeared in more than forty films since 1971.

Filmography

References

External links 

1945 births
Living people
Greek male film actors
People from Domokos